Village Fair (VF) is an annual music festival located in Bathurst, Australia which first started as a community Festival for students from rival dormitories of Charles Sturt University, Bathurst campus, in 1974. It has increasingly expanded to include not only local indie music acts, but also popular Australian headliners.

History
Starting in 1974 as an event to rival another dorm's social activities, Village Fair consisted of a Ferris wheel, giant slides, stalls, and theme-based dorm common rooms. Students of CSU (at that time, a Teacher's College) volunteered to organize the activities. The name originates from where the Fair was originally held; on John Oxley Village Green, where John Oxley Village (JOV) is an on-campus Residence, hence Village Fair.

The event became a part of the local community's event calendar, and for many years it was preceded by a student parade through the streets of Bathurst on the morning of the Fair. Each 'Hut' - one of the 10 dormitory buildings that collectively make up JOV - was made responsible for devising and operating a stall or event for the Fair. Over time, it became obvious that one of the most popular stalls was the International Beer Tent run by D and E Huts. By the mid-1990s this had become the main focus, combined with a line-up of musical entertainments to keep the drinkers happy.

Twenty years after the first event, the Fair took the form of a Music Festival on Saturday, 29 October 1994.

1995 saw Village Fair with an Under The Water theme, aiming to support the State Emergency Service (SES) by donating profits in the aid of upgrading SES equipment.

A large loss (negative profits) was incurred in 1997 when the Fair moved from its home on JOV Green to a space near the campus Rugby Oval. As a result, the 1998 Fair had its funding pulled by the university leaving the volunteer group to move the music venue into the University Bar and place the stalls on the Library Lawn.

In 1999, the venue again changed to University Hockey Fields, but the day was a washout due to heavy rain. A number of people suffered injuries due to drunken mud-sliding. The Fair moved again to a greenfield site next to the JOV dam, where it has stayed until 2006.

2007 saw the event move to the base of the famous Mt. Panorama. The festival site is now more than double any previous site that has hosted Village Fair.

The increasing popularity of the event saw more than 2000 people attend 2011's Village Fair, which was headlined by Sparkadia and supporting acts Papa Vs Pretty, DJ Sampology, Ball Park Music, Bang Gang Deejays, and Owl Eyes.

Artist lineups
Village Fair has attracted a number of popular upcoming Australian artists, most of which have gone on to have mainstream music careers, including Machine Gun Fellatio, Blue King Brown, The Basics, Ash Grunwald, Chaos Maths, Something for Kate, 28 Days, Kisschasy, Blue Juice, British India and Little Birdy.

The line-up has also featured several well-known DJs, including The Aston Shuffle, Bag Raiders, The Funky Punks, and The Purple Sneakers DJs.

2009 saw the event take a more mainstream direction in what was the biggest Village Fair to date. That year the line-up included Van She, Kid Confucius, Snob Scrilla, Cloud Control, Bag Raiders, The Bakery, The Sundance Kids, True Vibenation, Girl In The Red Light, and local CSU talent Horse & Lewi, Boylo & Will, and Go! Go! Machiner.

2001
 Machine Gun Fellatio
 Fatt Dex
 The Star System
 Pleasantville
 Gang Awry
 Dent
 Bianca Disco feat. Mr Bianca

2003
 Something For Kate
 Gelbison

2004
 Sonic Animation
 The Beautiful Girls
 Iota
 Between then and Now 
 National Pornographic
 Chaos Maths

2005
 Magic Dirt
 Gerling
 After the Fall
 The Panda Band
 Something with Numbers
 Bluejuice
 2-Up
 The Lyrical Madmen
 The Oceans
 Chaos Maths

2006
 Little Birdy
 28 Days
 True Live
 Bodyjar
 TZU
 Paul Greene
 Casual Projects
 Chaos Maths
 Over Pass

2007
 Kisschasy
 Blue King Brown
 Ash Grunwald
 The Basics
 Dukes of Windsor

2008
 The Aston Shuffle
 Bag Raiders
 British India
 Bluejuice
 The Jezabels
 Cassette Kids
 The Filthy Rich
 Beats Working
 The Charlie Lions
 Radiophobia
 The Bakery
 The Camels
 Watussi
 First Light
 The Blank Blank's
 The References
 EQD
 Break Academy
 Sooty And Sweep
 People's Republic

2009
 Van She
 Kid Confucius
 Cloud Control
 Bag Raiders
 The Sundance Kids
 Purple Sneakers DJs
 Snob Scrilla
 The Bakery
 True Vibenation
 Go! Go! Machiner
 Girl in the Red Light 
 Horse & Lewi 
 Boylo & Will

2010
 Miami Horror
 Yves Klein Blue
 The Only
 The Melodics
 Beni
 Hey Now
 Redcoats
 Brittle
 [me]
 Lovers Jump Creek
 Bloody Lovely Audrey
 Treeboi & Kone

2011
 Sparkadia
 Sampology
 Papa Vs Pretty
 Bang Gang Deejays
 Owl Eyes
 Ball Park Music
 The Snowdroppers
 Stonefield (band)
The Ruminaters
 Lime Cordiale
 Sticky Fingers
 The Nectars

2012
 Sneaky Sound System
 The Potbelleez
 Pez (musician)
 Rainbow Rd
 Peacock Dreams
 Gambit
 Bloody Lovely Audrey
 Mo Slabs
 Anti Prophet
 DJ Mrcian
 Doin A Bit DJs
 DJ Fish
 DJ Benny
 Broken Neck of the Woods
 Get Wet

2013
 Yacht Club DJs
 Draft & N'Fa
 Strange Talk
 The Gris wolds
 Foley & Van C
 Peacock Dreams
 Gun face
 Ben Largely
 Rainbow Rd
 Blue Red Army

See also

List of historic rock festivals
List of festivals in Australia

References

 Village Fair - History. Retrieved June 2007.

External links 

 Village FairOfficial Website 

Electronic music festivals in Australia
Music festivals established in 1974
Rock festivals in Australia
Festivals in New South Wales